Sargodha Medical College ( or SMC) is a public sector medical college located in Sargodha, Punjab, Pakistan.

It remained a constituent college of University of Sargodha till 31st December 2021,  when the cabinet committee through its executive orders decided that the specialized healthcare and medical education department of the government of the punjab would take control. It was further directed by the government of Punjab that during the transition period (January to June 2022) University of Sargodha would manage the finances of the college. It offers undergraduate academic degree of MBBS in affiliation with University of Health Sciences (Lahore) and postgraduate training programs of Fellow of College of Physicians and Surgeons Pakistan and  member of College of Physicians and Surgeons Pakistan in affiliation with College of Physicians and Surgeons Pakistan. In January 2023, University of Health Sciences, Lahore affiliated sargodha medical college to Faisalabad Medical University for an indefinite period of time.

Recognition and affiliation
 Affiliated with the University of Health Sciences, Lahore.
 It is recognised and is listed among the colleges in International Medical Education Directory.
It is accredited by the Pakistan Medical and Dental Council.

Aside from these, it offers undergraduate degrees in allied health sciences in the disciplines of radiology, pathology, surgery, and public health.

It also offers a five-year undergraduate degree in physiotherapy in affiliation with the University of Sargodha.

 Affiliated with the Faisalabad Medical University

History

The Sargodha medical college was established in 2006 as the constituent college of University of Sargodha. It is the only public sector medical school in Sargodha. For a first few years, the classes were arranged in different university lecture halls and a block of university was named after the college to temporarily accommodate the college and its administration till its own building was completed.

The institute's academic building was completed in 2011 and inaugurated by the then Prime Minister of Pakistan, Yousaf Raza Gillani. The district headquarters hospital in Sargodha was attached as the teaching hospital of this college and upgraded it to the tertiary care level. The college operates under the administrative control of Faisalabad Medical University

See also
College of Physicians and Surgeons Pakistan
Pakistan Medical and Dental Council
University of Sargodha
University of Health Sciences, Lahore
List of hospitals in Sargodha

References

External links
SMC official website

Medical colleges in Punjab, Pakistan
Universities and colleges in Sargodha District